The Bust of Cardinal Escoubleau de Sourdis is a marble portrait sculpture by the Italian artist Gian Lorenzo Bernini. Executed in 1622, the work depicts François de Sourdis. It is currently in the Musée d'Aquitaine in Bordeaux, France.

See also
List of works by Gian Lorenzo Bernini

Notes

References

Further reading

External links

1620s sculptures
Busts in France
Marble sculptures in France
Busts by Gian Lorenzo Bernini